Kani is a tribe living in the Western Ghats area of Kerala, India.
Their use of the forest plant arogyapacha (trichopus zeylanicus) as a key ingredient in a herbal remedy called Jeevani was noted by visiting scientists in the 1980s. The formula was eventually developed as a commercial enterprise by Arya Vaidya Pharmacy, with the tribe's Kerala Kani Welfare Trust receiving license fees and royalties. Members have been encouraged to cultivate the plant. A recently discovered species of tree-dwelling crab has been named Kani maranjandu  after the tribe. 

""The Kani tribals are a traditionally nomadic community, who now lead a primarily settled life in the forests  of western Ghats of Kerala and Tamilnadu. Kani are  mostly inhabitants of the Trivandrum and Kollam Districts in Kerala. The kani tribal traditions are fast disappearing due to urbanization, rapid industrialization and changes in economy. The Proper documentation of tribal knowledge   are totally lacking it is also necessary to need scientific study about the traditional knowledge of Kani tribe.(anooj.sl et al.2021)  Now Mr. Anooj SL doing the PhD work entitled as ETHNOBOTANICAL STUDY OF KANI TRIBES IN WESTERN GHATS OF KERALA under the guidance of Dr. G Rajkumar Senior Scientist and HOD PSES Division  JNTBGRI Palode.

References

Social groups of Kerala
Scheduled Tribes of India